Iulia Necula (born April 26, 1986 in Constanţa), is a Romanian professional table tennis player.

She competed in the team competition at the 2008 Summer Olympics.

References
2008 Olympic profile

1986 births
Living people
Sportspeople from Constanța
Romanian female table tennis players
Table tennis players at the 2008 Summer Olympics
Olympic table tennis players of Romania